Patrick Clarke is an Irish writer, director, producer and actor. Clarke  co-wrote and produced his first feature Beyond the Pale in 1999. Based on actual events, the immigrant drama was a commercial success in Ireland, Australia and the UK and won awards at the Houston and Arizona film festivals (2000). Clarke's performance in Beyond the Pale led to roles in The Magnificent Ambersons for A&E Networks and the award-winning black comedy Stay Until Tomorrow (2004), which was developed through the Sundance Institute.

In 2004, Clarke formed i4i Productions, which completed many projects including One (2008), written and performed by Greg Pearl, John Illsley and Paul Brady; the feature-length documentary The Extra Mile  and the period feature thriller Trapped a.k.a. Anton
 which was nominated for three Irish Academy Awards at the 6th Irish Film & Television Awards. Clarke appeared in Aiyaary  a Hindi action thriller directed by Neeraj Pandey, it was released worldwide on February 16, 2018  and wrote, produced and directed ‘The New Theatre’ a film about Dublin’s most inspirational Independent theatre venue (New Theatre, Dublin), released on Arts & Education platforms across the United States in February, 2019.

Early life 
 Clarke was born in the Rotunda Hospital. He spent the first five years of his life living in Ballymun before moving to Finglas, a suburb of the city of Dublin. He attended Beneavin De La Salle College. He played Gaelic football for Erin's Isle GAA Club (Irish: Oileán na hÉireann) and soccer for Beggsboro A.F.C. an Irish association football club based in Cabra, Dublin. A serious knee injury during a match for Erin's Isle in 1983 brought his playing days to an end.

Filmography
 The Last Actor (Short) (1994)
 Fall From Grace (Short) (1994)
 Sex and The City The Man the Myth the Viagra, TV (1999)
 Harlem Aria (1999)
 Beyond the Pale (film) (1999)
 The Magnificent Ambersons (2002 film)
 Stay Until Tomorrow (Film) (2004)
 Shattered (2007)
 The Extra Mile (2007)
 Anton (2008)
 Anton The Making of Anton (2009)
 Alexander & Pete , TV (2012)
 Aiyaary (2018)
 Tonight with Roger Goodman (Short) (2018)
 The New Theatre Documentary (2019) New Theatre, Dublin:
 Autopsy (TV series) The Last Hours of Jeffrey Epstein (2020)
 Only Love Matters (2022) 
 Beyond the Pale: A Look Back Documentary (2022)
 Lughill (2023)
 Merrifield (2023)
 Lock it Up (2023)

References

External links

Irish screenwriters
1965 births
Living people
Hunter College alumni
Irish expatriates in the United States
Irish male film actors
Irish film producers
Male actors from Dublin (city)
20th-century Irish male actors
21st-century Irish male actors
Film people from Dublin (city)
People from Finglas